Dame Anna Patricia Lucy Hassan, DBE (née Fusco; born 1946, Northern Ireland) is a British educator. She is Consultant Head at Daubeney Primary School, and a former Executive Head of Millfields Community School (Hilsea Street, Hackney, London).

Teaching career
1963: Trains at Coloma College, West Wickham, Kent (a Catholic teacher training school)
1967: Starts teaching at St Joseph's Primary School in Southwark, London
1979: Works in schools throughout Hackney after taking a break to raise her son
1983: Appointed deputy head at Grasmere School, Hackney; later named headteacher
1993: Invited to take charge of Millfields
2009: Retires from Millfields and takes up consultancy

Millfields
Hassan was credited with turning the Millfields Community School, one of London's worst-performing schools, around academically, although it took a dozen years.

Biography
Anna Patricia Lucy Fusco was born and raised in Banbridge, County Down, Northern Ireland, by Italian parents, where she initially went into the family business managing a small chain of ice-cream parlours, then soon after took up her calling as a teacher. A Roman Catholic, she is married to Nevzat Hassan, a Turkish Cypriot Muslim, and has been since 1971; they have one son, Dogan Nevzat (born 1972, London).

Honours
In 2005, Hassan received an honorary fellowship from the University of Gloucestershire. The following year, in 2006, for her service to education, Hassan was created a Dame Commander of the Order of the British Empire.

External links
Profile, checkcompany.co.uk 
Hackney Council Website profile
The Society of Education Consultants Profile.
"How To Make a Difference" website
Conference of the Association of Education & Library Boards (2009) analysis of Millfields School (cache version)

References

1946 births
Heads of schools in England
British people of Italian descent
British Roman Catholics
People from Northern Ireland of Italian descent
Educators from Northern Ireland
Dames Commander of the Order of the British Empire
Living people
People from Hackney Central
People from Banbridge
Date of birth missing (living people)
Women educators from Northern Ireland
20th-century educators from Northern Ireland
21st-century educators from Northern Ireland
20th-century women educators
21st-century women educators